KAGV (1110 AM) is a radio station licensed to serve Big Lake, Alaska, United States.  The station is owned by Voice For Christ Ministries, Inc.  It airs a religious radio format.

The station was assigned these call letters by the Federal Communications Commission on January 30, 2002.

References

External links
KAGV official website

Gospel radio stations in the United States
Moody Radio affiliate stations
Radio stations established in 2002
2002 establishments in Alaska
AGV
Matanuska-Susitna Borough, Alaska